Monica Michelle Jurado Stonier (born October 5, 1976) is an American educator and politician serving as a member of the Washington House of Representatives, representing the 49th district since 2017. A member of the Democratic Party, she previously served one term representing the 17th district.

Stonier was born to a Japanese American mother and Mexican American father, and works as a middle school teacher and instructional coach.

References

1976 births
Living people
Democratic Party members of the Washington House of Representatives
Women state legislators in Washington (state)
American politicians of Japanese descent
American politicians of Mexican descent
American women of Japanese descent in politics
Asian-American people in Washington (state) politics
American educators of Japanese descent
21st-century American politicians
21st-century American women politicians